
Hubertus Lamey (30 October 1896 – 7 April 1981) was a German general in the Wehrmacht during World War II. He was a recipient of the Knight's Cross of the Iron Cross of Nazi Germany.

Awards and decorations 

 German Cross in Gold on 28 July 1943 as Oberst in Grenadier-Regiment 328
 Knight's Cross of the Iron Cross on 12 February 1944 as Oberst and deputy commander of the 28. Jäger-Division

References

Citations

Bibliography

 
 

1896 births
1981 deaths
Military personnel from Mannheim
German Army personnel of World War I
Recipients of the clasp to the Iron Cross, 1st class
People from the Grand Duchy of Baden
Recipients of the Gold German Cross
Recipients of the Knight's Cross of the Iron Cross
German prisoners of war in World War II held by the United Kingdom